Angelika Beblo (born 11 March 1961) is a German rower. She competed in two events at the 1984 Summer Olympics.

References

1961 births
Living people
German female rowers
Olympic rowers of West Germany
Rowers at the 1984 Summer Olympics
Sportspeople from Saarbrücken